The 2013–14 Puebla season was the 67th professional season of Mexico's top-flight football league. The season is split into two tournaments—the Torneo Apertura and the Torneo Clausura—each with identical formats and each contested by the same eighteen teams. Puebla began their season on July 21, 2013 against Pumas UNAM, Puebla play their homes games on Sundays at 12:00pm local time.

Torneo Apertura
List of Mexican football transfers summer 2013

Regular season

Apertura 2013 results

Goalscorers

Results

Results summary

Results by round

Apertura 2013 Copa MX

Group stage

Apertura results

Goalscorers

Results

Results by round

Torneo Clausura

Current squad

List of Mexican football transfers summer 2013

Regular season

Clausura 2014 results

Goalscorers

Results

Results summary

Results by round

Clausura 2014 Copa MX

Group stage

Apertura results

Goalscorers

Results

Results by round

References

Puebla F.C. seasons